Dmitry Kutsenko, better known as Your Old Droog, is a Ukrainian-born American rapper and producer from Brooklyn, New York. He first gained public attention in June 2014 when online rumors were circulated that his self-published debut EP was actually recorded by veteran New York rapper Nas under an alter ego, before revealing himself in August of that year as a 25-year-old Ukrainian American. His self-titled debut album was released digitally on November 25, 2014.  The name "Droog" comes from the Ukrainian word 'друг' meaning "friend".

Biography 
Droog's family emigrated to the United States from Ukraine when he was four years old. His family was Jewish, and his first language was Russian. As a young rap enthusiast growing up in Brooklyn, Droog first developed his craft in lunchroom battles in school.

In April 2014, he released the song "Nutty Bars",  which generated a significant amount of buzz due to comparisons to Nas and the otherwise lack of information about the artist. The speculation began after Sacha Jenkins, a longtime associate of Nas, made a short positive review of the rapper on Mass Appeal with the sub-heading "Who is this guy? None of your damn business! Just enjoy the music and stop asking questions." The 10-song Your Old Droog EP was released soon after in June on SoundCloud, produced by Droog and RTNC (later known as Mono En Stereo ).  In August, Droog revealed himself in an interview with The New Yorker and soon showed his face for the first time in a video of him freestyling.  At the time, he embraced the publicity and speculation regarding his identity, expressing that "This is like my street team, why would I stop free publicity?" He played his first concert on September 3 to a sold-out crowd at Webster Hall.  His debut self-titled album was released digitally on November 26, which included the 10 songs from the EP along with 8 new songs produced by EL RTNC. A limited edition of the album was released on vinyl shortly before the digital release.

Kinison EP, Your Old Droog's second EP, was released on February 4, 2015, again on SoundCloud.  Kinison'''s lyrical theme is that of Droog's appreciation of rock music as a child, with songs named after Rage Against the Machine, Porno for Pyros, and Sonic Youth.  That February and March, Your Old Droog supported DJ Premier and Royce da 5'9" on their PRhyme Tour.  Your Old Droog's third EP, The Nicest, was released on July 17, 2015.

In February 2017, Your Old Droog released What Happened to Fire?, an EP in collaboration with Ratking rapper Wiki.  Later that month, Packs, Droog's second full-length album, was announced to be released on March 10, 2017. To coincide with the announcement, a music video for the album's single "Help" was released, featuring Wiki and Edan.

Droog released three full-length albums in 2019, with It Wasn't Even Close, Transportation, and Jewelry.  It Wasn't Even Close was produced by Mach-Hommy and came out on April 20, 2019, featuring appearances by DOOM, and Wiki.  Transportation was produced again by Mono En Stereo and was released in June. Jewelry was released on December 23, 2019, featuring collaborations with the album's executive producer Mach-Hommy as well as DOOM, Matisyahu, Quelle Chris, Edan, and Cohen Beats. The album is a celebration of his Jewish heritage, labeled a "A Chanukah Celebration" with Your Old Droog stating "I'm no longer going to diminish my heritage for your comfort, some people hate simply for the sake of hating, let them crumble under the weight of that burden...we will celebrate light and life...I'm a Jew in America. This is my story. Shalom."

 Artistry and influences 
Your Old Droog has been extensively compared to fellow New York rapper Nas, to the point of theories being developed that his debut EP was actually recorded by Nas under an alter ego.  Droog has appreciated the comparison and deemed it a compliment; he also named Big Daddy Kane, Big L, and Kool G Rap as influences, as well as Beanie Sigel, Freeway, Cassidy, and Lloyd Banks.  He has named MF DOOM as one of his favorites, from whom he has learned his approach to privacy as a rapper in the public eye.

 Discography 

 Studio albums 
 Your Old Droog (2014)
 Packs (2017)
 It Wasn't Even Close (2019)
 Transportation (2019)
 Jewelry (2019)
 Dump YOD: Krutoy Edition (2020)
 TIME (2021)
 Space Bar (2021)

 Collaboration albums 
 Tha Wolf on Wall St. (with Tha God Fahim) (2021)
 Tha YOD Fahim (with Tha God Fahim) (2021)
 Tha Wolf on Wall St. 2: The American Dream (with Tha God Fahim) (2022)

 Extended plays 
 Your Old Droog EP (2014)
 Kinison (2015)
 The Nicest (2015)
 What Happened to Fire? (with Wiki) (2017)
 Looseys (2017) 
 YOD Wave (2022)
 Yod Stewart (2022)
 Yodney Dangerfield (2022)
 The Yodfather (2022)
 The Shining'' (2022)

Singles

As lead artist

Guest appearances

Other songs

References

1989 births
Living people
Rappers from Brooklyn
20th-century American Jews
American people of Ukrainian-Jewish descent
Jewish rappers
21st-century American rappers
21st-century American Jews